Stu Williamson (born 5 August 1956, in Oadby, Leicestershire, England) is a portrait photographer based in Leicestershire, UK. He grew up in England but has a mix of Scottish and Irish ancestry. Prior to his career in photography he was drummer for the Scottish pop rock group The Marmalade from 1978 to 1980 and performed on their 1978 album Doing It All For You. He then directed his artistic talents towards photography and has continued in this field ever since.

Photography
Williamson specialises in monochrome photography and Fine Art portraiture influenced by European Mediaeval Artists. He has gained commissions for architectural photography in Dubai from Giorgio Armani at the Burj Khalifa and the Jumeriah Group’s Burj Al Arab.  He is also the inventor of the Tri-flector, a photographic lighting reflector intended to offer the photographer greater versatility.

Williamson worked as photographer for the artwork on the 1998 Cradle of Filth album Cruelty And The Beast.

Awards

Williamson has won many photographic awards in Europe which have included Black and White Photographer of the Year, Fine Art Photographer of the Year and Architecture Exterior Photographer of the Year 2010  for his photograph of the Burj Khalifa.

Most recently in 2016, he won the UK Master Photographer of the Year 2016/17 award.

Stu Williamson Photography
Williamson originally established Stu Williamson Photography business in Cornwall before moving to Market Harborough, Leicestershire, in 1997. In 2006 Williamson moved the business to Dubai.

In 2013, after investment from an entrepreneur friend, Williamson sold his majority stake in the Dubai business and subsequently returned to the UK  where he continues his photography business from his studio in Kibworth, Leicestershire.

Personal life
Williamson is also a Medium and is actively involved in ghost hunting.

References

External links 

1956 births
Living people
Photographers from Leicestershire
People from Oadby
People from Market Harborough
People from Kibworth